Michael Stephen Portnoy (born April 20, 1967) is an American musician who is primarily known as the former drummer, backing vocalist, and co-founder of the progressive metal band Dream Theater. In September 2010, Portnoy announced his departure from Dream Theater after 25 years, with Mike Mangini taking his place as drummer of the band. Since his departure Portnoy has remained active, with a variety of bands and projects, including Adrenaline Mob, Transatlantic, Yellow Matter Custard, Flying Colors, The Winery Dogs, Liquid Tension Experiment, Metal Allegiance, Sons of Apollo, the Neal Morse Band and BPMD.

Early life 
Portnoy was born April 20, 1967, and raised on Long Island in Long Beach, New York. He is Jewish. His father, Howard Portnoy (1940–2009), worked as a DJ at a local radio station. Mike and his father later moved to Carmel-by-the-Sea, California, to work at KRML radio station after watching the 1971 film Play Misty for Me. His mother died on November 16, 1984, when the private plane she was riding in, with her boyfriend, crashed off the Atlantic City coastline.

Portnoy's father's job helped him gain an appreciation for music at an early age particularly, as Portnoy has pointed out, because he had access to his father's collection of LPs. He developed a preference for bands including Rush, Queen, Led Zeppelin, The Who, Iron Maiden, and the Beatles, among many others. Portnoy claims to be self-taught as a drummer, though he did take music theory classes in high school. During that period he began playing in local bands, two of which (Rising Power and Inner Sanctum) recorded and released independent albums.

Career

Dream Theater: 1985–2010

Portnoy left Inner Sanctum (his last high school band) after being awarded a scholarship to attend the Berklee College of Music in Boston. There, he met John Petrucci and John Myung. They formed a band, initially taking the name "Majesty" before changing their name to Dream Theater. They left Berklee soon after.

Known for his technical skill as a drummer in Dream Theater, Portnoy has won 30 awards from the Modern Drummer magazine. He co-produced six Dream Theater albums with guitarist John Petrucci, starting from Metropolis Pt. 2: Scenes from a Memory through Black Clouds and Silver Linings and was one of the main songwriters during his tenure. He is the second youngest person (after Neil Peart) to be inducted into the Modern Drummer Hall of Fame, at 37 years of age.

In the spring of 2010, Portnoy filled in for Avenged Sevenfold's former drummer, Jimmy "The Rev" Sullivan, who died during the production of the band's fifth album Nightmare. On May 5, 2010, Portnoy released a statement on his status with Avenged Sevenfold on their official website, concluding his working relationship with the band. 

On September 8, 2010, Portnoy announced he would be leaving Dream Theater. The band hired Mike Mangini to take his place after inviting and holding auditions with seven "world-class" drummers. 

Avenged Sevenfold chose not to continue working with Portnoy after the Nightmare tour was completed, in part due to the significant controversy surrounding his departure from Dream Theater. Following this, Portnoy announced that he asked to return to Dream Theater, but was turned down by their lawyer as the band had already brought Mangini fully onboard and he had left his tenured teaching position at Berklee College of Music to join the band.

Former and current projects: 1997–present
Portnoy is known for his many side projects and tribute bands. He is a founding member of Liquid Tension Experiment, an instrumental progressive rock band featuring fellow Dream Theater members John Petrucci and Jordan Rudess along with bassist Tony Levin. He is also a founding member of Transatlantic, a progressive rock "super-group" featuring former Spock's Beard keyboardist/vocalist Neal Morse, Flower Kings guitarist Roine Stolt and Marillion bassist Pete Trewavas. Outside of Transatlantic, Portnoy has worked with Neal Morse extensively, appearing on most of his solo albums. He is a member of The Neal Morse Band, featuring guitarist/vocalist Eric Gillette, bassist Randy George, and second keyboardist/vocalist Bill Hubauer. Portnoy has also recorded and/or toured/performed live with OSI, Hail!, Stone Sour, Fates Warning, Overkill and G3. Over the years, Portnoy has created tribute bands to the Beatles, Led Zeppelin, Rush, and the Who.

After his departure from Dream Theater, Portnoy formed several new bands, starting with Adrenaline Mob, a traditional heavy metal/hard rock band with singer Russell Allen (of Symphony X) and guitarist Mike Orlando. On June 4, 2013, however, Portnoy announced his departure from Adrenaline Mob, citing scheduling conflicts. 

Portnoy is a founding member of Flying Colors, a progressive rock band also featuring Steve Morse, Neal Morse, Dave LaRue, and Casey McPherson.

He also founded The Winery Dogs, a power trio also featuring bassist Billy Sheehan (Mr. Big) and guitarist Richie Kotzen (formerly of Mr. Big and Poison); Sons of Apollo, a progressive metal supergroup also featuring Sheehan, Derek Sherinian, Jeff Scott Soto and Ron "Bumblefoot" Thal; Metal Allegiance, a thrash metal/groove metal band also featuring Mark Menghi, David Ellefson (Megadeth) and Alex Skolnick (Testament); and BPMD, a supergroup/cover band also featuring Menghi, Phil Demmel (Vio-lence) and Bobby "Blitz" Ellsworth (Overkill). He is also a member of PSMS, with Tony Macalpine, Billy Sheehan and Derek Sherinian.

Artistry and influences

In the April 2001 edition of Modern Drummer and Portnoy's website, he names Neil Peart, Carl Palmer, Bill Bruford, Terry Bozzio, Billy Cobham, Alan White, Stewart Copeland, Phil Collins, Chester Thompson, Simon Phillips, Nick D'Virgilio, Andy Sturmer, Dave Lombardo, Jon Fishman, Vinnie Colaiuta, Peter Criss, Ringo Starr, Tommy Lee, John Bonham, Lars Ulrich, and Keith Moon as influences.

Portnoy played bass when Dream Theater performed as the fictitious band Nightmare Cinema. Before live performances of "Trial of Tears", he would sometimes switch instruments with John Petrucci and play a fragment of "Eruption" by Van Halen. In Nightmare Cinema, he went by the stage name "Max Del Fuvio".

Portnoy played bass guitar and xylophone during a song on Liquid Tension Experiment 2. He has also contributed lead and harmony vocals to numerous projects.

Personal life
Portnoy and his wife Marlene (née Apuzzo) live in Upper Saucon Township in the Lehigh Valley region of Pennsylvania with their children, Melody Ruthandrea and Max John. Marlene used to be a guitarist in the all-female band Meanstreak, and two of the other members, guitarist Rena Sands and bassist Lisa Martens, are married to Dream Theater guitarist John Petrucci and bassist John Myung, respectively.

Max Portnoy, like his father Mike, is a drummer. His band Next to None opened for Adrenaline Mob in Atlanta on April 6, 2013. As of December 26, 2017, Max is playing drums in his new band Tallah. With a post he published on his official Instagram account on October 14, he revealed that he is the new drummer of the band Code Orange, too.  

Portnoy is a recovering addict and has openly discussed it. The five song set Twelve-step Suite deals with his experience of substance abuse. He edged away from alcohol and drugs in April 2000 and has remained sober since then.

Equipment 
He endorses Tama drums, Sabian Cymbals, Promark Drumsticks and Remo Drumheads. Though Portnoy is mainly a drummer and backing vocalist he also contributes lead vocals, bass guitar and keyboards.

Discography

Dream Theater
 When Dream and Day Unite (1989)
 Images and Words (1992)
 Awake (1994)
 A Change of Seasons (1995)
 Falling into Infinity (1997)
 Metropolis Pt. 2: Scenes from a Memory (1999)
 Six Degrees of Inner Turbulence (2002)
 Train of Thought (2003)
 Octavarium (2005)
 Systematic Chaos (2007)
 Black Clouds & Silver Linings (2009)

Liquid Tension Experiment
 Liquid Tension Experiment (1998)
 Liquid Tension Experiment 2 (1999)
 Liquid Tension Experiment 3 (2021)

Transatlantic
 SMPT:e (2000)
 Bridge Across Forever (2001)
 The Whirlwind (2009)
 Kaleidoscope (2014)
 The Absolute Universe (2021)

Liquid Trio Experiment
 Spontaneous Combustion (2007)
 When the Keyboard Breaks: Live in Chicago (2009)

Avenged Sevenfold
 Nightmare (2010)

Neal Morse
  Testimony (2003)
  One (2004)
  ? (2005)
  Sola Scriptura (2007)
  Lifeline (2008)
 Testimony 2 (2011)
  Momentum (2012)
 Sola Gratia (2020)

The Neal Morse Band
 The Grand Experiment (2015)
 The Similitude of a Dream (2016)
 The Great Adventure (2019)
 Innocence & Danger (2021)

Flying Colors
 Flying Colors (2012)
 Second Nature (2014)
 Third Degree (2019)

John Petrucci
 Terminal Velocity (2020)

Adrenaline Mob
 Adrenaline Mob (2011)
 Omertà (2012)
 Covertà (2013)

BPMD
 American Made (2020)

Haken
 Restoration (2014)

Metal Allegiance
 Metal Allegiance (2015)
 Fallen Heroes (2016)
 Volume II: Power Drunk Majesty (2018)

OSI
 Office of Strategic Influence (2003)
 Free (2006)

Sons of Apollo
 Psychotic Symphony (2017)
 MMXX (2020)

The Winery Dogs
 The Winery Dogs (2013)
 Hot Streak (2015)
 Dog Years (2017)

John Arch
 A Twist of Fate (2003)

Between the Buried and Me
 Colors II (2021) (Drum solo on "Fix the Error")

References

External links

Avenged Sevenfold members
1967 births
Living people
People from Lehigh County, Pennsylvania
People from Long Beach, New York
Berklee College of Music alumni
American heavy metal drummers
American heavy metal singers
American male singers
Record producers from New York (state)
Dream Theater members
American rock drummers
Musicians from Pennsylvania
OSI (band) members
Transatlantic (band) members
20th-century American drummers
American male drummers
Adrenaline Mob members
Twisted Sister members
Liquid Tension Experiment members
The Winery Dogs members
Flying Colors (band) members
Inside Out Music artists
Magna Carta Records artists
Roadrunner Records artists
Metal Allegiance members
Yellow Matter Custard members
Jewish heavy metal musicians